Matsumoku Industrial was a Japanese manufacturing company based in Matsumoto, Nagano, between 1951 and 1987. Established in 1951 as a woodworking and cabinetry firm, Matsumoku is remembered as a manufacturer of guitars and bass guitars, including some Epiphone and Aria guitars.

(There is occasional confusion between "Matsumoku" and "Matsumoto". Matsumoto is a town in Japan's Nagano Prefecture, where FujiGen Gakki, Gotoh, and other musical instrument companies have manufacturing plants. Matsumoto Musical Instrument Manufacturers Association is also the name of a musical instrument manufacturing cooperative, headed by Gotoh).

History
In 1951, Matsumoku was founded as Matsumoto Mokkō  ("Matsumoto Woodworking Company") by Mr. Tsukada in Matsumoto, Nagano, Japan. It was a family-owned woodworking business that specialized in building tansu cabinets and butsudan.

Shortly after the World War II (1939-1945), the Singer Corporation had established a Japanese subsidiary, Singer Sewing Machine Company Japan, and set up production facilities in Nagoya. Singer contracted Matsumoku Industrial to build its sewing machine cabinets, and in 1951 Matsumoku became a partially owned subsidiary of Singer Japan.  Matsumoku also branched out into building cabinets for manufacturers of televisions and "hi-fi" amplifiers.

Production
In the early 1960s (or mid-1950s), Matsumoku began to look into other woodworking markets when several subcontracts of Singer Corporation were moved to the Philippines and, as it had on its staff several skilled luthiers, ventured into guitar and violin production in 1963.  Modest classical guitars, small steel-stringed acoustic guitars, mandolins and violins were built and marketed in the mid-1960s.  However, as other Japanese companies were producing similar instruments, Matsumoku set out to distinguish itself by producing high-quality acoustic and electric archtop guitars.  Several of Matsumoku's early archtop guitars survive, most owing their basic designs to Hofner, Framus, and Gibson. By the early 1960s, Matsumoku had acquired new mills, lathes and specialized presses and began to increase musical-instrument production.  This new equipment, operated by its staff of skilled craftsmen, enabled Matsumoku to realize the mass production of high-quality guitars.

By the early 1970s, Matsumoku had begun using CNC (computer numerical controlled) mills, routers, and lathes, one of the first guitar makers to do so. This created a significant economy of scale, allowing the company to rely upon factory automation rather than skilled labor for rough shaping of components and basic assembly tasks. Even so, 60% of the construction process was still done by hand, including planing, fretting, joining, and assembly.  This machine-cut yet hand-worked process offered improved profit margins at lower unit prices and yielded high quality instruments with unique character.

Matsumoku produced guitars, or parts of guitars, for Vox, Guyatone, FujiGen Gakki, Kanda Shokai (Greco), Hoshino Gakki (Ibanez), Nippon Gakki (Yamaha), Hondo professional series (USA guitar company), Aria and Norlin (parent company of Gibson). American owned Unicord contracted Matsumoku to build most of its Univox and Westbury guitars. St. Louis Music imported Matsumoku-built Electra Guitars. J. C. Penney sold Matsumoku-built Skylark guitars through its catalog division.  Matsumoku built many early Greco guitars as well as Memphis, Vantage, Westbury, Westminster, C.G.Winner, Cutler, Lyle and Fell. Washburn Guitars contracted with Matsumoku to build some of its electric guitars and basses from 1979 through 1984. Though the names above reflect Matsumoku's involvement, many of the names were later sold to other companies, which made guitars that were completely different in quality and sound.

Although its name began appearing on neck-bolt plates, headstocks, and sound-hole labels in the 1970s, Matsumoku's role in the making of guitars under contract was largely unknown outside of Japan's guitar-making circles. Matsumoku's contract with St. Louis Music, which had marketed Matsumoku-made guitars under the Electra name, was taken over by Unicord, which owned the Westone name, and the guitars Matsumoku built during the resulting transitional phase bear the dual name Electra-Westone.
Matsumoku's final phase as a maker of guitars under contract was making the Westbury, Westminster and Westone brands owned by American importer/marketer Unicord (which named those brands after the location of its headquarters in Westbury, Connecticut). In 1979, however, when its contract with Matsumoku came to an end, Unicord chose not to renew it but rather to cut costs by moving production to Korea. Thus, once again, Matsumoku found itself in need of work. This time, though, rather than seeking a new distributor, Matsumoku began to self-market its guitars under its own brand name: Vantage.

Aria

Shiro Arai founded Arai and Company in 1953 as an importer of classical guitars.  In 1960, Arai contracted Guyatone to manufacture guitars. At the time, Guyatone was one of Japan's leading musical instrument manufacturers.  However, when exported to the western United States, the drier American climates caused early Guyatone-produced guitars various problems: bindings became unglued, backs split, and necks broke just below the headstock. Guyatone could not meet Arai's production requirements, and in 1964, Arai and Company contracted for musical instrument manufacturing with Matsumoku.

Arai addressed these issues early on with Matsumoku's management.  The solution was to use wood that had been dried for at least two years, stronger glues with longer clamp times, and one feature that remained throughout Matsumoku's production: the 3-piece maple neck.

Besides Matsumoku, Aria had two factories that produced guitars, one of which made classical guitars, and another that made medium-grade and specialty guitars. But the relationship between the two companies was both amicable and symbiotic.  Aria focused on sales in both domestic and export markets and provided design development, while Matsumoku devoted its energies to engineering and building guitars and other stringed instruments.  Throughout its 22-year business relationship, Aria remained Matsumoku's principal client.  Matsumoku often preferred using Aria as its business agent, and many of Matsumoku's contracts were written by Aria with Matsumoku stated or implied as sub-contracted manufacturer.

Arai and Company guitars were briefly labeled Arai, but switched to the familiar Aria around 1966. From the 1975 arrival of design engineer Nobuaki Hayashi (currently with Atlansia) onward, however, all Aria guitars were labeled Aria Pro II. Hayashi's pseudonym, "H. Noble", appeared on many of the Aria Pro II instruments he designed. Aria's guitars that followed showed remarkable design innovation and a definitive move away from Gibson and Fender formats.  Hayashi is best known as the designer of the Aria Pro II, SB-1000 bass and the Aria Pro II PE-series guitars. Some of these were made with maple bodies, but higher-end models such as the PE1000 with Protomatic pickups and the PE1500 with DiMarzio pickups, had ash bodies. These ash-bodied guitars were produced only in relatively small numbers for the domestic market; most, however, had maple bodies. Some guitars were produced with the urushi finish and, again, these, in both red and brown urushi lacquer, were produced mostly for the domestic market. The vast majority of these have ash bodies, whereas the export models were made mainly of maple.

Matsumoku also manufactured drum kits under the Aria name, initially under licence from Remo, which had identified a gap in the market for low-cost drum kits in the compact 5-piece "rock" configuration as innovated by the Rogers PowerTone range in the early 1970s.

Epiphone

Gibson decided to move Epiphone production to Japan in the early 1970s and chose Aria as its contractor. As a subcontractor to Aria, Matsumoku manufactured most electric Epiphones made in Japan from 1970 through 1986 (a few solid body electrics were made by other Japanese manufacturers and at least one model was made in Taiwan).  Models include the solid body ET series (Crestwood) the SC series (Scroll) and the Model 1140 (Flying V) as well as Epiphone's archtop electric guitars: 5102T/EA-250, Sheraton, Riviera, Casino, and Emperor.

Early Matsumoku made Epiphone archtops and hollow-body basses had four-point bolt on necks. As production costs of bolt on neck guitars were less, some guitarists regarded them as inferior instruments.  However, it was not the neck construction that was inferior (as described below, many Matsumoku-built necks were of premium quality).  Rather, it was the lack of reinforcement in the neck pocket area, which could enable, that area to act like a hinge, causing future problems with high action due to tension on the body's neck pocket from the strings.  Collectors of Matsumoku guitars from this period have often solved this problem by fabricating and installing permanent custom neck shims.  Set neck archtop guitars followed in late 1975.  Specifications on Epiphone archtops changed throughout the Matsumoku era.

Distinguishing characteristics 

Many Matsumoku built guitars, including Epiphone archtops, utilized a 3 piece maple neck with the center section's grain-oriented 90 degrees from the side wood. This created a very strong neck not prone to splitting or warping. An often used variation of this is the 5 piece neck with two thin trim strips of walnut or ebony separating the 3 sections. Matsumoku made many neck-through-body solid-body electric guitars and basses, most with 5 piece necks.

Matsumoku often utilized the Nisshin Onpa company (who own the Maxon Effects brand) as a subcontractor for its pickups. Some Maxon pickups have Maxon's "M" logo stamped on the back.

The name Matsumoku appeared on the neck bolt plate of some guitars they built. Early Grecos and some 1980s Aria Pro IIs have Matsumoku on the neck bolt plate. Other neck plates were blank or simply had the word "Japan" stamped on them.

Many Matsumoku set-neck guitars and basses have the inspector's hon (name stamp) stamped inside the neck pick-up cavity.

End of production 

Gibson restructured after being sold by Norlin and began to move its Epiphone production to other Japanese manufacturers and to Korea.  By 1986, the home sewing machine market was in heavy decline and Singer was nearly bankrupt.  Matsumoku could not afford to buy itself out of Singer and in 1987, closed down.

After Matsumoku ceased operations, Aria continued production of Aria Pro II guitars and basses through its own factories and other manufactures. Some top line and special edition guitars are still manufactured in Japan, however, most Aria guitars are now produced in Korea and China.

Information about Matsumoku's contribution to guitar making is better known now due in large part to the Internet.  Matsumoku's products enjoy a strong following among devoted enthusiasts.

Notable players of Matsumoku guitars
Earl Hooker, Univox Rhythm and Blues bolt-on Les Paul copy.
Kurt Cobain of Nirvana, Univox Hi-Flier, Epiphone ET-270, Aria Pro II Cardinal Series CS-250, Washburn Force 31
John Taylor of Duran Duran, Aria Pro II SB-700, Aria Pro II SB-900, Aria Pro II SB-1000 bass
Cliff Burton of Metallica, Aria Pro II Elite, Aria Pro II Black'n'Gold bass
Elvin Bishop, Electra Model 2281
Neal Schon, Aria Pro II PE series guitars (several models)
Noel Gallagher and Paul "Bonehead" Arthurs of Oasis played Matsumoku-manufactured Epiphone Rivieras in mid-1990s
Dave Brock of Hawkwind plays a Matsumoku made Westone Spectrum LX among other Westone guitars
Wayne Hussey of The Mission plays a (very rare) Matsumoku Aria Pro II RS-800/12
Tim Smith of Cardiacs, Westone Thunder I
James Iha of The Smashing Pumpkins and A Perfect Circle, Epiphone ET-270 
Robert Smith of The Cure, Epiphone 5102T / EA-250

See also
 Kent guitars

References
 
 
citations

External links

 The Guitar Gallery, The Guitars of Matsumoku
 Westone Guitars, the home of Westone
 Information on MiJ Guitars, French
 Nobuaki Hayashi, Atlansia
 Guyatone

Guitar manufacturing companies
Musical instrument manufacturing companies of Japan
Companies based in Nagano Prefecture